The 2018 Los Angeles County Board of Supervisors elections were held on June 5, 2018. Two of the five seats (for the First and Third Districts) of the Los Angeles County Board of Supervisors were contested in this election.

Results

First District

Third District

References

External links 
Los Angeles County Department of Registrar-Recorder/County Clerk

Los Angeles County Board of Supervisors
2018
Los Angeles County